Yuri of Silla (?–57, r. 24–57) was the third king of Silla, one of the Three Kingdoms of Korea. He is commonly called Yuri Isageum.

Family
Parents
Father: King Namhae of Silla
Grandfather: King Hyeokgeose of Silla
Grandmother: Lady Aryeong
Great-Grandmother: Lady Saso
Mother: Lady Unje (알영부인)
Consorts and their respective issue: 
Queen Ilsaeng (이리생부인)
Son: King Ilseong of Silla (died 154, r. 134–154) – was the 7th ruler of Silla
Queen Kim, of the Kim clan (부인딸 김씨), daughter of Prince Sayo (사요왕의)
Son: King Pasa of Silla (died 112, r. 80–112) – was the 5th ruler of Silla,

Name 
As a descendant of Silla's founder Hyeokgeose, his surname was Park.

His title was Isageum, also recorded as Ijilgeum or Chijilgeum. This title is a change from Geoseogan (the first king Hyeokgeose) and Chachaung (second king Namhae). The actual Silla word is thought to be Itgeum . Imgeum is the modern Korean word for "King".

Background 
Yuri was the son of Silla's second ruler, Namhae, and his queen Lady Unje. It is unclear how many siblings Namhae had, but he did have a sister. This sister, Princess Ani, was married to a non-Sillan man named Seok Talhae, who originated from an island nation called Tapana. Talhae became a very highly ranked official and Namhae seemed to prefer him as successor instead of his son. This is revealed on Namhae's deathbed, but Talhae insisted that the prince's rise to the throne would be righteous and allowed Yuri to become the next ruler of Silla.

Reign 
According to the Samguk Sagi, the principal source for events of this period, Yuri centralized rule over the aristocracy by turning the six tribes into six official administrative divisions of Silla in 32.  He is said to have granted surnames to each of the clans: Yi, Choe, Son, Jeong, Bae, and Seol. He is also said to have created 17 bureaucratic rank levels.  However, modern scholars doubt that these occurred so early in Silla's development.

In 37, When Muhyul(無恤) attacked Nakrang Kingdom and destroyed it, 5000 people of the Nakrang country surrendered. They were divided into Silla's six divisions. This is when the legend of Princess Nakrang occurred.

Silla was attacked by Lelang commandery and other tribes, but made peace with Maekguk(貊國). 
The Samguk Sagi records that Silla conquered Iseoguk(present-day Cheongdo) in Yuri Isageum era

During Yuri's reign, the Silla people celebrated a holiday during the 15th day of the 8th month, where two teams of women would compete in a contest. The losers of the contest would have to prepare songpyeon, rice cakes, meats, fruits, and other food, shared by everyone in a feast. This is said to have been the origin of the modern Korean holiday Chuseok.

Also during Yuri Isageum's reign was the rise of the Gaya confederacy as a military power in the region. Silla was under constant rivalry with Baekje(or maybe Mahan) already, but Gaya in the middle was even more of a direct threat.

Succession 
Yuri Isageum had two sons, but his dying words were to make his brother-in-law, Seok Talhae, his successor to the throne. Yuri Isageum died in 57 AD after 34 years of reign.

See also
Three Kingdoms of Korea
Rulers of Korea
Proto–Three Kingdoms of Korea

References
The Academy of Korean Studies
Korea Britannica

Silla rulers
57 deaths
1st-century monarchs in Asia
Year of birth unknown
1st-century Korean people